Sarnaq, or Sarna (سارنا), is a village in Zulachay Rural District, in the Central District of Salmas County, West Azerbaijan Province, Iran.

As of 1930, the village had a population of around 180. At the 2006 census, its population was 914, in 223 families. The population is mainly Azeri.

Sarnaq was badly damaged in the 1930 Salmas earthquake. The three churches of the village were damaged. Sourp Asdvadzadzin, an Armenian masonry church built in 1625, lost one of its walls. Mar Khinah church (built with sun dried bricks) was lost all of its outer walls, but was rebuilt. S. Hovanes was destroyed and never rebuilt.

References 

Populated places in Salmas County